Cabela's Big Game Hunter 5: Platinum Series is the fourth sequel to the original Cabela's Big Game Hunter. It was published in 2001 by Activision and developed by Elsinore Multimedia Inc.

External links
 allgame - Cabela's Big Game Hunter 5: Platinum Series

2001 video games
Windows games
Windows-only games
Activision games
Cabela's video games
Video games developed in the United States